Ibrahim Amin is a retired squash player from Egypt.

Career
In 1965, Amin finished runner-up at the British Open, losing 9–0, 0–9, 9–1, 9–6 in the final to fellow Egyptian player, A.A. AbouTaleb.

References

Egyptian male squash players
Year of birth missing (living people)
Living people